Samyukta Hornad is an Indian actress who appears in Kannada films. Her debut movie was  Lifeu Ishtene directed by Pawan Kumar.
She is known for her roles in the commercially successful films Lifeu Ishtene (2011), Barfi (2011), Un Samayal Arayil (2014), and Oggarane (2014).

Life

Samyukta Hornad is a professional model and actress based in Karnataka, India. She did her undergraduate studies in Media, English and Psychology at Christ University. She started her career as a TV show anchor before pursuing her career as a lead Actress. She has primarily appeared in Indian films and is considered a lead Actress in the film industry.

Samyukta Hornad's first movie was Aa Dinagalu Kannada. Her second movie was Lifeu Ishtene opposite Diganth.

Filmography

Web series

References

Indian film actresses
Living people
Actresses from Karnataka
Actresses in Kannada cinema
Actresses in Tamil cinema
Actresses in Telugu cinema
21st-century Indian actresses
1991 births
Christ University alumni
Actresses in Malayalam cinema